Chadron Municipal Airport  is in Dawes County, Nebraska, United States, five miles west of Chadron. It sees one airline, Southern Airways Express, subsidized by the Essential Air Service program.

Facilities
Chadron Municipal Airport covers 716 acres (290 ha) at an elevation of 3,298 feet (1,005 m). It has two concrete runways: 3/21 is 5,998 by 100 feet (1,828 x 30 m) and 12/30 is 4,400 by 75 feet (1,341 x 23 m).

In the year ending June 22, 2020 the airport had 7,665 aircraft operations, an average of 21 per day: 69% general aviation, 16% airline, 9% air taxi and 6% military. In March 2022, there were 12 aircraft based at this airport: all 12 single-engine.

Airline and destination

Historical airline service 
The first airline flights were Western DC-3s in 1956; Frontier replaced Western in early 1959. The last Frontier Twin Otter left in 1980. Great Lakes Airlines flew to Denver International Airport, connecting to United Airlines and Frontier Airlines, which both had codeshare agreements with Great Lakes. Boutique Air took over Great Lakes' service beginning July 15, 2015.

Statistics

Accidents and incidents 
 On June 12, 2013, a general aviation aircraft crashed during takeoff. The pilot had minor injuries, and the FAA was notified and sent investigators from the FAA in Rapid City.

References

External links 
 Chadron Municipal Airport at City of Chadron website
  at the Nebraska Department of Aeronautics
 Aerial photo as of May 1999 from USGS The National Map
 

Airports in Nebraska
Chadron, Nebraska
Buildings and structures in Dawes County, Nebraska
Essential Air Service
Transportation in Dawes County, Nebraska